Uncharacterized protein KIAA1377 is a protein that in humans is encoded by the KIAA1377 gene.
Also known as Cep126, the protein has been shown to localize to the centrosome. Furthermore, it is found at pericentriolar satellites and the base of the primary cilium. Depleting Cep126 leads to dispersion of pericentriolar satellites, in turn disrupting microtubule organization at the mitotic spindle.

Clinical relevance
Mutations in this gene have been found to cause monomelic amyotrophy.

References

Further reading